Against the Odds is an American documentary television series targeted to children and adolescents, that was produced and originally broadcast by Nickelodeon from 1982 through 1984. The series, hosted by Bill Bixby and narrated by Philip Proctor, profiled inspirational stories of people throughout history.

Geraldine Laybourne, then-program manager and later president of  Nickelodeon, noted that her young son described the show as "a series of little tragedies" that famous people overcame on their journey to what made them so well known.

The series is unrelated to the US military battlefield history series of the same name that was originally broadcast on the American Heroes Channel from 2014 through 2016.

Profiles
Against the Odds profiled several notable historical figures including:

Albert Einstein
Paul Robeson
Pablo Picasso
Bessie Smith
Louis Pasteur
Margaret Mead
Elizabeth Blackwell
Dorothea Lange
Malcolm X
Napoleon Bonaparte
Walt Whitman
Joan of Arc
George Washington Carver
Martin Luther King Jr.
Frank Lloyd Wright
Pancho Villa
Adolf Hitler
Charles Darwin
Al Capone
Jackie Robinson
Harry Houdini
Golda Meir
Helen Keller
D.W. Griffith
Samuel Adams
Abraham Lincoln
Charles Lindbergh
Thomas Edison
Henry Ford
Vladimir Lenin
Amelia Earhart
Franklin Roosevelt
Eleanor Roosevelt
Andrew Carnegie
Rudolph Valentino
John Glenn
Babe Didrickson
Robert Oppenheimer
Pelé
Ludwig van Beethoven
Mahatma Gandhi
Mao Tse-tung
Winston Churchill
Clara Barton
Woody Guthrie
Elizabeth Cady Stanton
Susan B. Anthony
Sarah Bernhardt
P. T. Barnum

References

External links
 

1980s Nickelodeon original programming
1980s American children's television series
1982 American television series debuts
1984 American television series endings
American children's education television series
Biographical television films
Historical television series
Television series about the history of the United States